Les Trois Frères, le retour is a 2014 French film written, directed by and starring Didier Bourdon and Bernard Campan alongside their Les Inconnus partner Pascal Légitimus. It is the sequel to the blockbuster film Les Trois Frères.

Cast 
 Didier Bourdon: Didier Latour
 Bernard Campan: Bernard Latour
 Pascal Légitimus: Pascal Latour
 Sofia Lesaffre: Sarah
 Vivienne Vernes: Moss Godin Matiss
 Fatima Adoum: Sabrina
 Biyouna: Sarah's grandmother
 Sabine Pakora: The nurse
 Christian Hecq : lawyer Maître Vaselin
 Philippine Leroy-Beaulieu: bank clerk at Pascal's bank
 Daniel Russo: Michael's Stepfather 
 Alison Wheeler: guest at Moss' party

References

External links
 

2014 films
French comedy films
2010s French films